Quintalia stoddartii is an extinct species of air-breathing land snail or semislug, a terrestrial pulmonate gastropod mollusk in the family Helicarionidae. This species was endemic to Norfolk Island.

References
 

Quintalia
Extinct gastropods
Gastropods described in 1834
Taxa named by John Edward Gray
Taxonomy articles created by Polbot